Siméon Sawadogo is a Burkinabé politician. He is currently the Minister of State, the Minister of Territorial Administration, the Minister of Decentralization and Social Cohesion.

Biography
Siméon Sawadogo was born in Sabcé, Bam Province. He earned a master's degree from University of Joseph Ki-Zerbo (present-day University of Ouagadougou). In 1982, he began his career in the public service as a teacher of primary schools. In 1994, he joined the Ministry of Territorial Administration as High Commissioner of the Oubritenga Province in Ziniaré, then of Sanmatenga Province in Kaya. From 1997 to 2007, he was elected a member of the National Assembly.

On 20 February 2017, he was appointed the Minister of State for Territorial Administration. On 19 January 2019, he resigned together with other members of Thieba cabinet. On 24 January, he was appointed the Minister of State,  Territorial Administration, the Minister of Decentralization and Social Cohesion.

Health
During the 2020 coronavirus outbreak, on 21 March, Sawadogo contracted the coronavirus.

References

Living people
Government ministers of Burkina Faso
University of Ouagadougou alumni
People from Centre-Nord Region
Year of birth missing (living people)
21st-century Burkinabé people